Elands Bay is a town in South Africa, situated in the Western Cape Province, on the Atlantic Ocean, at . The town is located about 220 kilometres (two and a half hours drive) north from Cape Town. It is a world class surfing location and is also noted for its caves, which have a number of rock paintings. 

In 2009, Heritage Western Cape declared the Elands Bay Cave and most of Baboon Point (Cape Deseada), on which it is located, as a provincial heritage site. Eland's Bay along with much of this coastline is an "important" bird habitat.  The local wetland, Verlorenvlei, is a Ramsar wetland.

See also
 Mussel Point, a large "prehistoric" shell midden near Elands Bay
 Verlorevlei River
 Elands Bay Cave

References

External links

Roadmap to Elandsbay
Elandsbay Backpackers & Information
National Heritage Resources Act 25 of 1999

Surfing locations in South Africa
Populated places in the Cederberg Local Municipality